The Per Brahe statue is a monument of Per Brahe the Younger, the Governor-General of Finland and first chancellor of the Academy of Turku, located in  in Turku, Finland. It was designed by Walter Runeberg and revealed in 1888.

The statue is made of bronze and stands 2.95 metres high. The base is made of red granite, standing 4 metres high. The base has the Swedish text Iagh war med landett och landett med mig wääl tillfreds ("I was satisfied with my country and my country satisfied with me").

Runeberg had made one statue before for the base built for Brahenpuisto, but the base was too small, so this earlier statue was sold to Raahe, where it was placed in the Pekkatori square in the city centre. Runeberg sculpted the one seen in Turku later the same year.

Other statues of Brahe are located in Raahe (slightly larger copy of the work by Walter Runeberg also from 1888), Lieksa (1953), and Kajaani (1954) in Finland; in Gränna (1916), Sweden.

Gallery

References

External links
Information on the sculpture, from the Wäinö Aaltonen Museum of Art

Statues and sculptures in Turku
1888 sculptures
Sculptures of men
Outdoor sculptures in Finland
Monuments and memorials in Finland